Dr. Matt Destruction (born Mattias Bernwall; 18 March 1978 in Fagersta), is a Swedish musician and songwriter. He is the former bassist of garage rock band The Hives.

Career
The Hives were formed in 1993 and rose to prominence in the early 2000s as a leading group of the garage rock revival, playing garage rock influenced rock music. Dr. Matt typically plays a 1970s Fender Telecaster Bass which differs from the earlier late 1960s Telecaster bass and 1950s Precision Bass (which the Telecaster bass was basically a reissue of) in that the bass has a humbucker rather than a single coil pickup. His bass is in the band's signature white/black color combo along with a white Hiwatt amplifier; he almost always uses bass distortion and a pick. He also occasionally plays a Rickenbacker bass, as seen in the "Hate to Say I Told You So" music video.

Dr. Matt departed the band in 2013.

Discography

Barely Legal (1997)
Veni Vidi Vicious (2000)
Tyrannosaurus Hives (2004)
The Black and White Album (2007)
Lex Hives (2012)

References 

 Dr. Matt Destruction Interview

External links 
 Official Website
 Official MySpace

1978 births
Living people
Swedish bass guitarists
The Hives members
People from Fagersta Municipality
21st-century bass guitarists